Ukraine selected their Junior Eurovision Song Contest 2014 entry through a national final which consisted of eighteen songs. The final was held on 9 August 2014 in Bukovel, Ukraine. Sympho-Nick and their song "Pryyde vesna" (Прийде весна) was chosen as the winner.

Before Junior Eurovision

National final
The final took place on 9 August 2014, which saw eighteen competing acts participating in a televised production where the winner was determined by a 50/50 combination of both public telephone vote and the votes of jury members made up of music professionals. Sympho-Nick was selected to represent Ukraine with the song "Pryyde vesna".

At Junior Eurovision 

At the running order draw which took place on 9 November 2014, Ukraine were drawn to perform eighth on 15 November 2014, following  and preceding .

Voting

Detailed voting results
The following members comprised the Ukrainian jury:
 Olexandr Zlotnyk
 Andrii Yakumenko (Andre France)
 Kateryna Pryshchepa (Illaria)
 Alla Popova
 Kateryna Komar

Notes

References

Junior Eurovision Song Contest
Ukraine
2014